The 2013 Central Connecticut Blue Devils football team represented Central Connecticut State University in the 2013 NCAA Division I FCS football season. They were led by eighth year head coach Jeff McInerney and played their home games at Arute Field. They were a member of the Northeast Conference. They finished the season 4–8, 2–4 in NEC play to finish in a tie for sixth place.

Schedule

References

Central Connecticut
Central Connecticut Blue Devils football seasons
Central Connecticut Blue Devils football